The 2015 season is Suphanburi's fifth season in the Thai Premier League of Suphanburi Football Club. Since 2006–2007 and 2013 to present.

Pre-season and friendlies

Thai Premier League

Thai FA Cup
Chang FA Cup

Thai League Cup
Toyota League Cup

Squad statistics

Transfers
First Thai footballer's market is opening on 6 November 2014 to 28 January 2015

Second Thai footballer's market is opening on 3 June 2015 to 30 June 2015

In

Out

Loan in

Loan out

Suphanburi
2015